John Gargan (October 20, 1930 – November 4, 2018) was an American financial consultant who became the second chairman of the Reform Party (after Russ Verney) started by Ross Perot. He was ousted from this position by a 109–31 vote in February 2000. He asked his supporters to boycott the illegally-called convention. He is also known for the creation of Throw the Hypocritical Rascals Out (T.H.R.O.), an organization whose platform was to vote out all incumbent members of congress and to set term limits on all members of Congress. He is considered the "father" of the American term limits movement.

Life and career

John "Jack" Gargan was born in Philadelphia, Pennsylvania on October 20, 1930. Gargan graduated from Prospect Park High School in June, 1948. In 2002 he and his brother Jim were two of the twenty graduates chosen to be in the Prospect Park High School (1932–1952) Hall of Fame. He joined the Pennsylvania National Guard, 111th Regimental Combat Team in October of 1947. He served in the US Navy and was honorably discharged in July. 1952. He then served in the US Army and was honorably discharged in July 1954.

Following his service in the military, Gargan attended Birmingham-Southern College and graduated in March, 1957 with a degree in Business Administration. After graduation, he moved to Florida and attended Stetson University College of Law in 1970.

Gargan had a career as an insurance agent and financial consultant since 1957 as well as a professional handwriting analyst since 1962. He was an adjunct professor of Finance from 1970 until 1986 at Hillsboro Community College in Tampa, Florida. He was recognized by the Chicago Board of Trade as one of the "outstanding instructors in finance in the USA".

In 1984, Gargan became the founder, President and CEO of the International Association of Registered Financial Consultants (IARFC). Now headquartered in Middletown, Ohio, it is the premier and largest professional associations for financial consultants in the world.

In 1985 he founded the MacGeoghegan Family Society, and in 1992 was honored in a ceremony televised on Irish National TV as the first Irish High Chief to be elected and inaugurated in more than 350 years. In 2012 Gargan was awarded the Clans of Ireland Order of Merit at the presidential palace in Dublin, Ireland

In Florida in 1990, Gargan, serving without compensation for most of the two-year campaign,  founded T.H.R.O. (Throw the Hypocritical Rascals Out), took $50,000 from his retirement savings to seed a series of "I'm mad as hell and I'm not going to take it anymore" newspaper ads (a reference to a famous line from the 1976 political and mass media satire movie Network), Over the next two years more than 300,000 supporters contributed to the campaign. In addition to holding hundreds of town hall meetings in all fifty states and appearing on more than a thousand radio and TV shows (including Donahue, Good Morning America and Inside Edition), he ran 633 full-page newspaper advertisements in nearly every major newspaper in the nation denouncing U.S. Congress for recklessly increasing the national debt, pandering to special interests and voting for legislative pay raises at a time when average wages nationwide were not increasing. For his efforts Gargan was named Time magazine's "Hero of the Week", earned the sobriquet "father of the national term limits movement", and was featured in full-color, multi-page cover stories in USA Today and the Orlando Sun weekend inserts.  More importantly, there were 124 new members of Congress in the 1992 elections, more than ten times the number of incumbents defeated in prior years.

In June, 1991 he was the originator and driving force of the "Draft Perot for President" campaign.

He was a guest speaker at the 2000 Libertarian National Convention, as well as at the Harvard Law School Forum in 1999.

In 1998, Gargan ran on the Reform Party ticket for the United States House of Representatives, 5th Congressional District seat against incumbent Democrat Karen Thurman. He received 33.7% of the vote (the highest vote count for a third party candidate [not "Independent"] in the history of the US), but still lost the election. In 2002, Gargan ran again for the seat, this time as an independent in a three-way Republican-targeted race. He received 3.4% of the vote. In this race, the Democrat incumbent Karen Thurman was defeated by Republican Ginny Brown-Waite. In 1994, with a war chest of only $68,000, he ran for Governor of Florida, getting the third highest vote count in a field of nine candidates, most spending millions. Only incumbent Governor Lawton Chiles and Republican Jeb Bush received more votes. Chiles was the winner of that election. He died in 2018 at the age of 88.

Early political career

Gargan ran for Tampa City Council in 1976 as "The Shoestring Candidate", spending only $4.56 as a protest candidate while others were spending upwards of $40,000 in a campaign for this part-time position paying only $9,000 annually. He lost 2 to 1 to Sandra Freedman, later elected Mayor of Tampa.

In 1984, angry over the ease with which charlatans were able to register as authorized financial planners, Gargan submitted his dog, Beauregard, for membership in the International Association for Financial Planning. The half-Schnauser, half-poodle received a membership card in the name Boris 'Bo' Regaard, CFP, CLU Certified Financial Planner, Chartered Life Underwriter. This was publicized in over 3,000  media outlets. It led to the demise of that once-powerful organization.

Publications

Gargan authored of How to Avoid Income Taxes and Estate taxes  –  Twenty-four Legal Ways To Keep your Money out of Uncle Sam's Pockets, How to Avoid Estate Taxes, The Complete Guide to Estate Planning (a Fortune magazine Book-of-the-Month selection), Milking Your Business for all its Worth, Money Management For Newlyweds And Other Beginners, and Growing Up Fast, Poor, Cold, and Hungry – A First-hand Account Of Life In The Great Depression.

He has current or past listings in Marquis' Who's Who in Finance and Industry, Who's Who in America, Who's Who in the World, Strathmere's Who's Who and International Men of Achievement, a British publication.

References

External links
 
 Photograph of Jack Gargan  at the Geoghegan family genealogical site

Florida politicians
Reform Party of the United States of America politicians
Florida Libertarians
1930 births
2018 deaths
Politicians from Philadelphia
Military personnel from Philadelphia
Writers from Philadelphia